The athletics competitions at the 2018 Mediterranean Games in Tarragona took place between 27 June and 30 June at the Campaclar Athletics Stadium while half marathons were held at the Adnan Menderes Boulevard.

Athletes competed in 34 events.

Schedule

Medal summary

Men's events

Women's events

Women's Para Athletics event

Medal table

Participating nations

References

External links
 2018 Mediterranean Games – Athletics
 Results

Sports at the 2018 Mediterranean Games
2018
Mediterranean Games
Mediterranean Games